Lakota may refer to:

Lakota people, a confederation of seven related Native American tribes
Lakota language, the language of the Lakota peoples

Place names
In the United States:
Lakota, Iowa
Lakota, North Dakota, seat of Nelson County
Lakota Local School District (disambiguation), two districts in Ohio
In other countries:
Lakota, Ivory Coast, a town in Ivory Coast
Lakota Department, a department in Ivory Coast

Other uses
Lakota (club), a Bristol nightclub
Lakota (surname)
Lavolta Lakota, a post-punk band
UH-72 Lakota, an American military helicopter

See also
 
Lakota Local School District (disambiguation)
Republic of Lakotah, a proposed independent republic within the northern Great Plains of the US

Language and nationality disambiguation pages